Halsbury may refer to:

 Halsbury, an historic estate in Devon
 Halsbury's Laws of England
 Halsbury's Laws of Australia
 Halsbury's Statutes
 Halsbury's Statutory Instruments
 Hardinge Giffard, 1st Earl of Halsbury
 Halsbury, Alberta, a locality in Canada